The Gruppe Monsun or Monsoon Group was a force of German U-boats (submarines) that operated in the Pacific and Indian Oceans during World War II. Although similar naming conventions were used for temporary groupings of submarines in the Atlantic, the longer duration of Indian Ocean patrols caused the name to be permanently associated with the relatively small number of U-boats operating out of Penang (primarily its capital, George Town).<ref>Paterson Lawrence(2004), Hitler's Grey Wolves: U-boats in the Indian Ocean, p. 29</ref> After 1944, the U-boats of the Monsun Gruppe were operationally placed under the authority of the Southeast Asia U-boat Region.

The Indian Ocean was the only place where German and Japanese forces fought in the same theatre. To avoid incidents between Germans and Japanese, attacks on other submarines were strictly forbidden. Altogether 41 U-boats of all types including transports would be sent; a large number of these, however, were lost and only a small fraction returned to Europe.Monsun boats Evacuation

Indian Ocean trade routes
The Indian Ocean was considered strategically important, containing India, and the shipping routes and strategic raw materials that the British needed for the war effort. In the early years of the war German merchant raiders and pocket battleships had sunk a number of merchant ships in the Indian Ocean; however as the war progressed it became more difficult for them to operate in the area and by 1942 most were either sunk or dispersed. From 1941, U-boats were also considered for deployment to this area but due to the successful periods known as the First and Second Happy Times, it was decided that sending U-boats to the Indian Ocean would be an unnecessary diversion. There were also no foreign bases in which units could operate from and be resupplied, hence they would be operating at the limits of their range. As a result, the Germans concentrated primarily on their U-boat campaign in the North Atlantic.

Japan's entry into the war in 1941 led to the capture of European South-east Asian colonies such as British Malaya and the Dutch East Indies. In May and June 1942, Japanese submarines began operating in the Indian Ocean and had engaged British forces in Madagascar. The British had invaded the Vichy-controlled island in order to prevent it from falling into Japanese hands – however, as Japan was never known (from post-war evaluation) to have had plans to place Madagascar within its own sphere of influence, Britain's defense of the island could also have been surmised to have been a plausible defense against any possibility of Madagascar falling under Germany's own ambitions.

Axis strategic raw materials

The German invasion of the Soviet Union in 1941 had ended the use of overland routes which were for the delivery of strategic materials from southeast Asia, and few Axis ships were able to avoid Allied patrols of the North Atlantic. Japan was interested in exchanging military technology with Germany, the Japanese submarine I-30 initiated the submerged transport of strategic materials in mid-1942 by delivering 1500 kg of mica and 660 kg of shellac.Paterson (2004), p.33 Japanese submarines designed for the vast distances of the Pacific were more capable transports than the compact German U-boats which were designed for operations around coastal Europe; but large Italian submarines had proved ineffective for convoy attacks. The Italian Royal Navy (Regia Marina) converted seven Italian submarines operating from BETASOM into "transport submarines" in order to exchange rare or irreplaceable trade goods with Japan. They were: The Bagnolin, the Barbarigo, the Cappellini (renamed Aquilla III in May 1943), the Finzi, the Giuliani, the Tazzoli and the Torelli.

Joint operations in the Indian Ocean

The idea of stationing U-boats in Malaya and the East Indies for operations in the Indian Ocean was first proposed by the Japanese in December 1942. As no supplies were available at either location, the idea was turned down, although a number of U-boats operated around the Cape of Good Hope at the time. A few days after Cappellini reached the East Indies, U-511 became the first U-boat to complete the voyage. This boat carried the Japanese naval attache Admiral Naokuni Nomura from Berlin to Kure. The boat was given to Japan as RO-500; its German crew returned to Penang to provide replacement personnel for the main submarine base being established at a former British seaplane station on the west coast of the Malayan Peninsula. A second base was established at Kobe; small repair bases were located at Singapore, Jakarta, and Surabaya. As part of the dispersal of U-boat operations following heavy losses in the North Atlantic in early 1943, Wilhelm Dommes was ordered to sail his U-178 from his operating area off South Africa to assume command at Penang.

Early submarine patrols to Penang
 Japanese submarine I-30 sailed 22 August 1942 carrying German torpedoes, Torpedo Data Computer, search radar, Metox, hydrophone array, 50 Enigma machines and 240 Bolde sonar countermeasure charges. She struck a mine and sank off Singapore on 13 October 1942.
 Tazzoli sailed in a cargo configuration on 21 May 1943 and was sunk by aircraft in the Bay of Biscay.
 Barbarigo sailed in a cargo configuration on 17 June 1943 and was sunk by aircraft in the Bay of Biscay.
  sailed in a cargo configuration on 11 May 1943 with 160 tons of mercury, aluminum, welding steel, 20mm guns, ammunition, bomb prototypes, bombsights and tank blueprints; she reached Singapore on 13 July 1943.
 U-511 sailed on 10 May 1943 and sank the 7,200-ton American Liberty Ship Samuel Heintzelman before reaching Penang on 17 July 1943.
 Giuliani sailed in a cargo configuration on 16 May 1943 and reached Singapore on 1 August 1943.
 U-178 sailed on 28 March 1943 and sank the 6,600-ton Dutch freighter Salabangka, the 2,700-ton Norwegian freighter Breiviken, the 6,700-ton British freighter City of Canton, the 7,200-ton American Liberty ship Robert Bacon and the 4,800-ton Greek freighters Michael Livanos and Mary Livanos before reaching Penang on 27 August 1943.
 Torelli sailed in a cargo configuration on 18 June 1943 and reached Penang on 27 August 1943.

First wave of Monsun Gruppe U-boats
With the base established, twelve submarines were assigned to the "Monsun Gruppe" and directed to proceed to Penang, patrolling along allied trade routes for the duration of their voyage. The group name reflected an intent; that the opening of the Indian Ocean U-boat campaign should coincide with the monsoon season. The Italian armistice with the allies became effective as the operation proceeded. The Italian submarine  surrendered at Durban, South Africa rather than continuing to Penang. The converted Italian cargo submarines were taken over by Nazi Germany's Kriegsmarine and renumbered with UIT prefixes.
 U-200 sailed on 11 June 1943 and was sunk off Iceland by a PBY Catalina on 24 June.
 U-514 sailed on 3 July 1943 and was sunk by a B-24 Liberator of the RAFs 224 Squadron in the Bay of Biscay on 8 July.
 U-506 sailed on 6 July 1943 and was sunk by an American 1st A/S Squadron B-24 Liberator in the Bay of Biscay on 12 July.
 U-509 sailed on 3 July 1943 and was sunk by aircraft from USS Santee on 15 July.
 U-516 sailed on 8 July 1943 but returned to France on 23 August after transferring its fuel to other boats, enabling them to continue when their tanker was sunk.
 U-847 sailed on 29 July 1943 but was damaged by ice in the Denmark Strait and was diverted to fuel other boats in the North Atlantic before being sunk by aircraft from USS Card on 27 August.
 Ammiraglio Cagni sailed in combat configuration in early July 1943 but surrendered after the Italian armistice became effective on 8 September 1943.
 U-533 sailed on 6 July 1943 and was sunk by a Bristol Blenheim of 244 Squadron RAF, 29 miles (46 km) off of Khor Fakkan in the Gulf of Oman on 16 October.
 U-188 sailed on 30 June 1943 and sank the 7,200-ton American Liberty ship Cornelia P. Spencer before reaching Penang on 31 October.
 U-532 sailed on 3 July 1943 and sank one Norwegian, one Indian and two British freighters before reaching Penang on 31 October.
 U-168 sailed on 3 July 1943 and sank the 2,200-ton British freighter Haiching before reaching Penang on 11 November.

A second wave of Monsun Gruppe U-boats was dispatched from Europe to make up for losses in transit.
 U-219 sailed on a minelaying mission on 22 October 1943 but returned to France on 1 January 1944 after being diverted to fuel other boats in the North Atlantic.
 U-848 sailed on 18 September 1943 and sank the 4,600-ton British freighter Baron Semple before being sunk by US navy PB4Y Liberators in the South Atlantic on 5 November.
 U-849 sailed on 2 October 1943 and was sunk by a USN PB4Y Liberator in the South Atlantic on 25 November.
 U-850 sailed on 18 November 1943 and was sunk by aircraft from USS Bogue on 20 December.
 U-510 sailed on 3 November 1943 and sank the 7385t British tanker San Alvaro, the 9970t Norwegian Erling Brøvig, the 9181t American freighter E.G.Seubert, the 7229t Norwegian Tarifa, the 7176t American John A. Poor and the 249t British minesweeping trawler Maaløy before reaching Penang on 5 May 1944.

Later sailings from Europe
Submarines attempting to reach Penang from Europe suffered heavy attrition, first from bombers in the Bay of Biscay, then from air patrols in the mid-Atlantic narrows and around the Cape of Good Hope, and finally from allied submarines lurking around Penang with the aid of decrypted arrival and departure information.
 Japanese submarine I-8 sailed 5 September 1943 with a cargo of anti-aircraft guns, torpedo and aircraft engines, and ten German technicians; and reached Singapore on 5 December 1943.
 U-177 sailed on 2 January 1944 and was sunk by a USN PB4Y Liberator in the South Atlantic on 6 February 1944.
  sailed in a cargo configuration as UIT-22 on 26 January 1944 and was sunk off the Cape of Good Hope by RAF 262 Squadron Catalinas on 11 March.
 U-801 sailed on 26 February 1944 and was sunk by aircraft from USS Block Island on 16 March.
 U-1059 sailed on 12 February 1944 with a cargo of torpedoes and was sunk by aircraft from USS Block Island on 19 March.
 U-851 sailed on 26 February 1944 with a cargo of mercury and 500 U-boat batteries, and disappeared in March 1944.
 U-852 sailed 18 January 1944 and sank the 4,700-ton Greek freighter Peleus and the 5,300-ton British freighter Dahomian before being sunk in the Arabian Sea by RAF Vickers Wellingtons on 3 April.
 U-1062 sailed on 3 January 1944 with a cargo of torpedoes and reached Penang on 19 April.
 U-1224 sailed as Japanese RO-501 in April 1944 and was sunk in the Atlantic by USS Francis M. Robinson on 13 May 1944.
 U-843 sailed ón 18 February 1944 and sank the 8,300-ton British freighter Nebraska before reaching Jakarta on 11 June.
 U-490 sailed in an oiler configuration on 6 May 1944 with a cargo of supplies, spare parts and electronics; she was sunk by aircraft from USS Croatan on 12 June 1944.
 U-860 sailed on 11 April 1944 and was sunk in the South Atlantic by aircraft from USS Solomons on 15 June.
 Japanese submarine I-29 sailed on 16 April 1944 with 10 Enigma machines and the latest German radar technology; she was torpedoed by USS Sawfish on 26 July 1944.
 U-537 sailed on 25 March 1944 and reached Jakarta on 2 August.
 U-181 sailed 16 March 1944 and sank the 7,100-ton British freighter Tanda, the 7,100-ton Dutch freighter Garoet and the 5,300-ton British freighters Janeta and King Frederick before reaching Penang on 8 August.
 U-196 sailed on 16 March 1944 and sank the 5,500-ton British freighter Shahzada before reaching Penang on 10 August.
 U-198 sailed 20 April 1944 and sank the 3,300-ton South African freighter Columbine, the 5,100-ton British freighter Director, the 7,300-ton British freighter  and the 7,200-ton British freighter  before being sunk in the Indian Ocean on 12 August 1944 by a Royal Navy hunter-killer group built around Shah and Begum.
 U-180 sailed in an oiler configuration on 20 August 1944 and was sunk by mines leaving port.
 U-862 sailed on 3 June 1944 and sank five ships before reaching Penang on 9 September.
 U-861 sailed on 20 April 1944 and sank the 1,700-ton Brazilian troopship Vital de Oliveira, the 7,200-ton American Liberty ship William Gaston, the 7,500-ton British freighter Berwickshire and the 5,700-ton Greek freighter Ioannis Fafalios before reaching Penang on 22 September.
 U-859 sailed on 4 April 1944 with a cargo of mercury and sank the 6,300-ton Panamanian freighter Colin, the 7,200-ton American Liberty ship John Berry and the 7,400-ton British freighter Troilus before being torpedoed off Penang by HMS Trenchant on 23 September.
 U-871 sailed on 31 August 1944 and was sunk by a RAF B-17 on 26 September 1944.
 U-863 sailed on 26 July 1944 and was sunk by USN PB4Ys on 29 September.
 U-219 sailed in a cargo configuration on 23 August 1944 and reached Jakarta on 11 December.
 U-195 sailed in an oiler configuration on 20 August 1944 and reached Jakarta on 28 December.
 U-864 sailed with a cargo of mercury and plans and parts for Messerschmitt Me 163 and Me 262 fighters on 5 February 1945 and was torpedoed by HMS Venturer on 9 February.
 U-234 sailed in a cargo configuration with 74 tons of lead, 26 tons of mercury, 12 tons of steel, seven tons of optical glass, 43 tons of aircraft plans and parts, 560 kg of uranium oxide and a disassembled Me 262 on 1 April 1945 and surrendered at Portsmouth Naval Shipyard when the war ended.

Submarine patrols from Penang
Although operations from Penang had originally been envisioned as patrols along the trade routes while transporting strategic materials to Europe, many were turned back after allied patrols sank South Atlantic refueling assets.
 Japanese submarine I-30 sailed on 22 April 1942 and reached France on 2 August.
 Japanese submarine I-8 sailed on 27 June 1943 carrying tungsten and an extra crew for U-1224, and reached France in late August 1943.
 Japanese submarine I-34 sailed 12 November 1943 and was torpedoed by HMS Taurus the following day.
 U-178 sailed 27 November 1943 with a cargo of 121 tons of tin, 30 tons of rubber and two tons of tungsten. She sank the 7,200-ton American Liberty ship Jose Navarro before reaching France on 25 May.
 Japanese submarine I-29 sailed 16 December 1943 with a cargo of rubber, tungsten, and two tons of gold; she reached France on 11 March 1944.
 U-532 sailed 4 January 1944 with a cargo of tin, rubber, tungsten, quinine and opium; and sank the 7,200-ton American Liberty ship Walter Camp two ships before returning to Penang after the refueling oiler Brake was sunk.
 U-188 sailed 9 January 1944 with a cargo of tin, rubber, tungsten, quinine and opium; and sank seven British freighters before reaching France on 19 June.
 U-168 sailed 28 January 1944 with 100 tons of tin, tungsten, quinine and opium; and sank a 4,400-ton Greek freighter and the 1,400-ton British repair ship Salviking before returning to Jakarta after Brake was sunk.
  sailed for France in a cargo configuration as UIT-24 with about 130 tons of rubber, 60 tons of zinc, five tons of tungsten, 2 tons of quinine, and 2 tons of opium on 9 February 1944; but returned to Penang after Brake was sunk.
 U-183 sailed 10 February 1944 with a cargo of tin, rubber, tungsten, quinine and opium; and sank the 5,400-ton British freighter Palma, the 7,000-ton British tanker British Loyalty and the 5,300-ton British freighter Helen Moller before returning to Penang after Brake was sunk.
 Giuliani sailed for France in a cargo configuration as UIT-23 on 15 February 1944 and was torpedoed three days later by HMS Tally-Ho.
 Japanese submarine I-52 sailed for France in a cargo configuration on 23 April 1944 with a cargo including two tons of gold and was sunk by Grumman TBF Avengers from USS Bogue on 23 June 1944.
 U-183 sailed on 17 May 1944 and sank one ship before returning to Penang on 7 July.
 U-1062 sailed for France in a cargo configuration on 6 July 1944 and was sunk in the Atlantic on 5 October.
 U-168 sailed 4 October 1944 and was torpedoed two days later by HNLMS Zwaardvisch.
 U-181 sailed 19 October 1944 and sank one ship before returning to Jakarta on 5 January 1945.
 U-537 sailed 8 November 1944 and was torpedoed the following day by USS Flounder.
 U-196 sailed 11 November 1944 and disappeared while traversing an allied minefield.
 U-862 sailed 18 November 1944 and sank two ships before returning to Jakarta on 15 February 1945. The ships sunk were the Robert J Walker on 25 December 1944 and the Peter Sylvester on 5 February 1945 near Fremantle.
 U-843 sailed for Norway on 10 December 1944 and was sunk in the Kattegat by RAF Mosquitoes on 2 April 1945.
 U-510 sailed for Norway with 150 tons of tungsten, tin, rubber, molybdenum and caffeine on 6 January 1945; and sank the 7,100-ton Canadian freighter  before surrendering in France.
 U-532 sailed for Norway on 13 January 1945 with a cargo of 110 tons of tin, eight tons of tungsten, eight tons of rubber, four tons of molybdenum and smaller quantities of selenium, quinine, and crystals. The type IXC40 boat sank the 3,400-ton British freighter Baron Jedburgh and the 9,300-ton American tanker Oklahoma; and surrendered at Liverpool when the war was over.
 U-861 sailed 14 January 1945 with 144 tons of tungsten, iodine, tin, and rubber; and arrived in Norway on 18 April.
 U-195 sailed for Norway in an oiler configuration on 17 January 1945 but returned to Jakarta on 3 March after experiencing engine trouble.
 U-183 sailed on 24 April 1945 and was torpedoed two days later by USS Besugo.

Japanese salvage
Six boats remaining in Japanese territory were taken over by the Imperial Japanese Navy when Germany surrendered in 1945.
 U-181 (type IXD2 cruiser) became I-501 was captured at Singapore and sunk by the Royal Navy in the Strait of Malacca in 1946.
 U-862 (type IXD2 cruiser) became I-502 was captured at Singapore and sunk by the Royal Navy in the Strait of Malacca in 1946.
 UIT-24 (originally , then Aquilla III) became I-503 and was found at Kobe when Japan surrendered and scuttled by the US navy in Kii Suido.
 UIT-25 (originally Torelli) became I-504 and was found at Kobe when Japan surrendered and scuttled by USN in Kii Suido.
 U-219 (type XB minelayer) became I-505 and was captured at Surabaya and sunk by the Dutch Navy in the Sunda Strait in 1946. 
 U-195 (type IXD1 oiler) became I-506'' and was scrapped at Jakarta after Japan surrendered.

Notes

External links
 Monsun boats - U-boats in the Indian Ocean and the Far East - uboat.net

Military units and formations of the Kriegsmarine
Monsoon Group
Military units and formations in British Malaya in World War II